Tropical Storm Bertha was a minimal tropical storm that made landfall twice along the Gulf Coast of the United States in August 2002. The second tropical storm of the 2002 Atlantic hurricane season, Bertha developed in the northern Gulf of Mexico out of a trough of low pressure that extended into the Atlantic on August 4. It quickly organized and reached tropical storm strength before making landfall on southeastern Louisiana. Bertha turned to the southwest over the state, and re-entered the Gulf of Mexico on August 7. It remained disorganized due to proximity to land, and after making landfall on south Texas, Bertha dissipated on August 9.

Bertha was one of only three tropical cyclones to make landfall on both Louisiana and Texas; the others being Allison in 2001 and Fern in 1971. Heavy surf killed one person in Florida. Damage was light, totaling to only $200,000 (2002 USD, $240,000 2008 USD).

Meteorological history 

A non-tropical trough at the surface extended from the northern Gulf of Mexico across Florida into the western Atlantic Ocean. On August 3, the western portion developed into a low pressure area. The eastern portion slowly organized and ultimately developed into Tropical Storm Cristobal. Northeasterly wind shear initially prevented organization of the cloud pattern, though the depression was able to strengthen to become Tropical Storm Bertha about five hours after it formed.

Outflow became much better organized as Bertha became a tropical storm, and well-defined banding features persisted to the north of the storm. Though convection waned, forecasters predicted the friction between land and the warm atmosphere to redevelop more deep convection, potentially resulting in further strengthening. However, the storm failed to intensify, and Bertha made landfall near Boothville, Louisiana as a minimal tropical storm early on August 5. It slowly weakened over the swampy portions of southeastern Louisiana, and degenerated to a tropical depression later on the 5th after crossing Lake Pontchartrain. Initially it was expected that a ridge of high pressure to its north would keep Bertha moving to the west and result in it slowly dissipating. However, it turned to the southwest, and reached the Gulf of Mexico again on August 7. The circulation persisted over land, and Tropical Depression Bertha quickly redeveloped convection. Though the environment was not unfavorable, its proximity to land prevented re-strengthening to tropical storm status. Though the system showed periods of increased organization as it moved southwestward, Bertha remained a weak tropical depression until making landfall on south Texas to the east of Kingsville on August 9. Bertha weakened quickly over land, and dissipated over southern Texas ten hours after making landfall.

Preparations 

The National Hurricane Center issued a tropical storm warning from Pascagoula, Mississippi to the mouth of the Mississippi River as Bertha became a tropical storm. The warning occurred 90 minutes before the storm made landfall. All warnings were discontinued when Bertha weakened to a tropical depression over Louisiana. No watches or warnings were required for Texas, due to the improbability of it re-intensifying.

The National Weather Service advised boats along the Gulf coast to remain at port. The service also issued a coastal flood watch from Alabama through the Florida Panhandle. A flood watch was issued for portions of eastern Louisiana and southwestern Mississippi.

Impact 

The area of low pressure preceding the development of Bertha produced rough surf and rip currents along the Florida coastline. In Perdido Key State Recreation Area, two children were swimming in an unguarded area when they were swept away by the currents. Their grandfather attempted to rescue them, but drowned in the rough waters. Another family rescued the two children. The large circulation of Bertha produced light rainfall across Florida, with Pensacola and Destin reporting 2.75 inches.

In Moss Point, the rainfall resulted in flooding which entered 15 to 20 houses and several cars. The rainfall also flooded roadways and streets. Damage in Mississippi totaled to $50,000 (2002 USD, $60,000 2008 USD).

The storm dropped heavy rainfall in Louisiana, which peaked at 10.25 inches in Norwood. The rainfall led to flash flooding in places, and also a few overflowed rivers in St. Tammany Parish. The flooding covered several roadways and bridges, and entered a few businesses and houses in East Feliciana Parish. Damage in Louisiana totaled to $150,000 (2002 USD, $180,000 2008 USD).

See also 

 Other storms of the same name
 List of Florida hurricanes (2000–present)

References

External links 

 NHC's archive on Tropical Storm Bertha
 

2002 Atlantic hurricane season
Atlantic tropical storms
Hurricanes in Florida
Hurricanes in Mississippi
Hurricanes in Louisiana
Hurricanes in Texas
2002 natural disasters in the United States
Bertha